The term district, in the context of Indonesia, refers to the third-level administrative subdivision, below regency or city. The local term  is used in the majority of Indonesian areas. The term  is used in provinces in Papua. In the Special Region of Yogyakarta, the term kapanewon is used for districts within the regencies, while the term  is used for districts within Yogyakarta, the province's only city. According to Statistics Indonesia, there are a total of 7,252 districts in Indonesia as at 2019, subdivided into 83,820 administrative villages (rural  and urban ).

During the Dutch East Indies and early republic period, the term district referred to kewedanan, a subdivision of regency, while  was translated as subdistrict.

Definition

District in Indonesia is the third-level administrative subdivision, below regency or city (second-level) and province (first-level). According to the Act Number 23 of 2014, district is formed by the government of regency or city in order to improve the coordination of governance, public services, and empowerment of urban/rural villages. District head is a career bureaucrat position directly appointed by regent or mayor. The local district term  is used in the majority of Indonesian areas, with  being the head.

During the Dutch East Indies and early republic period, the term district referred to kewedanan, a subdivision of a regency. Kewedanan itself was divided into , which was translated as subdistrict. The 1982 publication of Statistics Indonesia translated  as district.

The difference between the two is merely the naming, with kepala distrik being the district head. Sultan Hamengkubuwono X, the region's governor and the monarch of Yogyakarta Sultanate, issued Gubernatorial Decree Number 25 of 2019, which restored the old naming convention for the region's subdivisions. Kapanewon (a subdivision of regency) is headed by a panewu, while  (a subdivision of city), is headed by a mantri pamong praja.

List of districts

References

External links

 
Districts, Indonesia
Districts
Districts